Orsières railway station is a railway station in the municipality of Orsières, in the Swiss canton of Valais. It is the southern terminus of the standard gauge Martigny–Orsières line of Transports de Martigny et Régions.

Services 
 the following services stop at Orsières:

References

External links 
 
 
 

Railway stations in the canton of Valais
Transports de Martigny et Régions stations